is a quarter of Hamburg, Germany, in the borough of Bergedorf. In 2020 the population was over 23,000.

Geography

Neuallermöhe limits to the Berlin-Hamburg Railway and Billwerder to the north. It also borders with Allermöhe and Bergedorf. The quarter is divided into Neuallermöhe-West and Neuallermöhe-East. The quarter is well known for the town canals.

History

Neuallermöhe-East was built from 1982 until 1994. Neuallermöhe-West has been built since the 1990s. It was the youngest quarter until the foundation of HafenCity.

Politics
These are the results of Neuallermöhe in the Hamburg state election:

Transport
Neuallermöhe has two S-Bahn stations called Allermöhe and Nettelnburg. Furthermore six different bus lines go through the quarter. Neuallermöhe has access to the Autobahn 25.

References

Quarters of Hamburg
Bergedorf